111 Piccadilly, formerly Rodwell Tower, is a high-rise office building in Manchester city centre, England. It opened in 1965 and is now owned by Bruntwood.

The building is located at the corner of Ducie Street (near Station Approach which leads to Manchester's main railway station, Manchester Piccadilly). It is the last building in Piccadilly which continues here as London Road.

History
The architects of the tower were Douglas Stephen & Partners who had to solve the constructional problem of building a high building over the Rochdale Canal. Its external appearance is enhanced by the eight enormous columns which carry the building above the canal; however the rendered finish did not look so good after a few years of rain.

Refurbishment
Other technology in the building includes sensors monitoring air quality, space utilisation and energy usage.

Footnotes

References
Skyscrapernews.com entry

Buildings and structures in Manchester
Office buildings completed in 1965